American actor and producer James Garner (1928 – 2014) rose to prominence as a contract player for Warner Bros. in the 1957 television show Maverick as the series initial lead character Bret Maverick. He would continue to be associated with the Maverick brand several times in his career, as his original character Bret Maverick in the 1978 television film The New Maverick, briefly in the series Young Maverick (1979), and the series Bret Maverick (1981–1982). He also appeared in the role of Marshal Zane Cooper in the 1994 western film Maverick, with Mel Gibson portraying the role of Maverick.

His film work, playing the leading role in more than fifty motion pictures, was as noteworthy as his work in television. Garner was known for prominent roles in films such as Sayonara with Marlon Brando (1957), leading roles in Darby's Rangers with Stuart Whitman  (1958) and Cash McCall with Natalie Wood (1960), a supporting role in The Children's Hour with Audrey Hepburn and Shirley MacLaine (1961), leading roles in Boys' Night Out with Kim Novak and Tony Randall (1962), The Great Escape with Steve McQueen (1963), The Thrill of It All with Doris Day (1963), Move Over, Darling again with Doris Day (1963), The Wheeler Dealers with Lee Remick (1963), Paddy Chayevsky's The Americanization of Emily with Julie Andrews (1964), Roald Dahl's 36 Hours with Eva Marie Saint (1965), The Art of Love with Dick Van Dyke and Elke Sommer (1965), as Wyatt Earp in Hour of the Gun with Jason Robards  (1967), How Sweet It Is! with Debbie Reynolds (1968), Marlowe with Bruce Lee (1969), Murphy's Romance with Sally Field (1985), as Wyatt Earp again in Sunset with Bruce Willis (1988), My Fellow Americans with Jack Lemmon (1996), a supporting role in Divine Secrets of the Ya-Ya Sisterhood with Sandra Bullock (2002), a leading role in The Notebook with Ryan Gosling, Rachel McAdams and Gena Rowlands (2004), and in The Ultimate Gift with Brian Dennehy (2007).

For his portrayal of Jim Rockford in The Rockford Files, the Academy of Television Arts & Sciences awarded him the 1977 Primetime Emmy Award for Outstanding Lead Actor in a Drama Series. As Executive Producer of Promise for the Hallmark Hall of Fame, Garner won the 1987 Primetime Emmy Award for Outstanding Drama/Comedy Special. Promise also received the 1987 Peabody Award. In 1991, the academy inducted him into the Television Hall of Fame. He was the recipient of the 41st Screen Actors Guild Life Achievement Award in 2004. At the 26th Television Critics Awards in 2010, Garner was presented with the Career Achievement Award. 
His star was unveiled on the Hollywood Walk of Fame in 1959.

He formed Cherokee Productions in the 1960s with his talent agent and business partner Meta Rosenberg. As an independent producer, he was able to expand his entertainment goals irrespective of any one studio or distributor. Cherokee Productions created and produced the television series Nichols (1971–1972) and The Rockford Files (1974–1980), which he starred in. Numerous films were generated by Cherokee Productions, including Support Your Local Sheriff! (1969)  and Support Your Local Gunfighter (1971), both of which he starred in.

Film

Television

Bibliography

References

External links
 

Male actor filmographies
American filmographies